This is a list of marginal seats in the United Kingdom after the results in the 2005 General Election. At the next General Election, boundary changes applied affecting some of these seats.

Labour – Liberal Democrat marginals

Constituencies where the Labour Party holds a marginal lead over the Liberal Democrats:

Labour – Conservative marginals 

Constituencies where the Labour Party holds a marginal lead over the Conservative Party:

2005 United Kingdom general election
Lists of marginal seats in the United Kingdom by election